Doc Crane (1847 – April 17, 1920) was an American silent film actor.

Crane was a medical doctor in Boston who served in the Civil War and returned to his practice after its end. When he was 65, he moved to California to retire. After financial difficulties depleted his savings, he found work as a character actor at Universal studios, drawing upon his experience in amateur dramatic productions when he was in medical school.
 
He was signed in 1914 and starred in about 30 films before his retirement three years later in 1917.

Filmography

The Higher Law (1914)  King Louis XI
The Last Volunteer (1914)  Raolf Ardelheim
The Oubliette (1914)  King Louis XI
The Tragedy of Whispering Creek (1914)  Prospector
The Gambler's Oath (1914)
Father and the Boys (1915)
The Beloved Vagabond (1915)  Asticot
Lord John in New York (1915)  L.J. Calit
The College Orphan (1915) Socrates
The Broken Coin (1915) Pawnbroker
The Melting Pot (1915) Quincy Davenport
Mixed Blood (1916)
A Woman's Eyes (1916)
A Daughter of the Night (1916) 
The Human Cactus (1916)
What Love Can Do (1916) (as H.F. Crane) Matthew
A Youth of Fortune (1916) Professor Higgenbotham
Drugged Waters (1916) Dr. Jennings
The Red Lie (1916)
Discontent (1916)
The Grey Sisterhood (1916)
Flirting with Death (1917)
The Blood of His Fathers (1917) John Graham
The Lure of the Circus (1917)
Jungle Treachery (1917)
 Flirting with Death (1917)
 The Hidden Spring (1917) (as H.F. Crane) Daniel Kerston 
The Doctor's Deception (1917)
The Spirit of Romance (1917) (as H.F. Crane) Mace
Mary from America (1917)
Pollyanna (1920) (uncredited) Bit Role

References

External links

1847 births
1920 deaths
American male silent film actors
20th-century American male actors